The World Masters Non-Stadia Athletics Championships was a biennial international athletics competition for masters athletes aged 35 and over, organised by World Masters Athletics. Formerly known as the World Veterans Non-Stadia Championships, it was first held in 1992 and had its final edition in 2004.

Editions

References

 Non-Stadia
Masters Non-Stadia
Masters athletics (track and field) competitions
Recurring sporting events established in 1992
Recurring sporting events disestablished in 2004
Biennial athletics competitions
Defunct athletics competitions
1992 establishments in Europe
2004 disestablishments in Africa
2004 disestablishments in Asia
2004 disestablishments in North America
2004 disestablishments in South America
2004 disestablishments in Europe
2004 disestablishments in Oceania